The Rockford Expos was the initial moniker of the minor league baseball teams located in Rockford, Illinois from 1988 to 1999. The Expos were Rockford's first entity in the Midwest League and Rockford teams were minor league affiliates of the Montreal Expos (1988–1992), Kansas City Royals (1993–1994), Chicago Cubs (1995–1998) and Cincinnati Reds (1999), hosting home games at Marinelli Field.

After minor league first began in Rockford in 1871, Rockford hosted various teams in different minor leagues. The Rockford Expos were immediately preceded in Rockford by the Rockford Rox (1947–1949) of the Central Association. In 2000, the Rockford franchise moved to Dayton, Ohio, where the franchise played in the Midwest League and continues play today as the Dayton Dragons.

History
Minor league baseball began in Rockford, Illinois with the 1871 Rockford Forest Citys, who were one of the earliest professional teams. In 1947, the Rockford Rox returned minor league baseball to Rockford after a 24–year absence.

34 years after the Rockford Rox last played, Rockford became home to the Rockford Expos in 1988. The Midwest League's  expansion occurred in 1988 when the Rockford Expos and South Bend White Sox joined the Class A level, 14–team league.

The 1988 Expos finished third in attendance (158,674), were second in the northern division in the first half (39–29) and won the division in the second half (45–27). The Expos but lost in the postseason to the Kenosha Twins.

The 1989 Rockford Expos finished with a record 34–32 in the first half, winning the second half with a 40–27 record. Managed by Mike Quade, the 1989 Expos drew 139,338 fans (6th in the MWL). In the playoffs, the Expos lost to the South Bend White Sox, 2 games to none.

In 1990, the Rockford Expos finished the first half with a 34–34 record and were last with a 22–46 second half. The team drew 140,864 fans (5th in the 14–team league).

The 1991 Rockford Expos finished second in both halves with a 76–61 overall record. Attendance was 66,524, (12th in the league) as Pat Kelly and Rob Leary managed the team.

The 1992 Expos finished with a record of 66–70, with a home attendance total of 50,900 in 1992 (9th place).

After the 1992 season, the Rockford franchise agreed to eventually become an affiliate of the Chicago Cubs. An existing agreement with the Peoria Chiefs prevented the Cubs from leaving as a Peoria affiliate until 1994. So, Rockford, became a Kansas City Royals affiliate for the next two seasons.

The newly named Rockford Royals finished with a 78–54 overall record in 1993, playing under Manager Mike Jirschele. The Rockford Royals won the first–half northern division title with a 43–22 record. The Royals finished the regular season 1.0 games behind the Clinton Giants for the top Midwest League record, with attendance of 68,206. The Royals lost in the 1st round in the playoffs, two-games to zero to the South Bend White Sox.

Rockford was dominant in 1994, capturing a first-place finish in both halves (44–25 and 45–25), while drawing 70,527 fans. The Rockford Royals won their opening playoff series, beating the West Michigan Whitecaps two–games to zero. Rockford then lost 3 games to 1 to the Cedar Rapids Kernels in the 1994 Midwest League finals.

As planned, Rockford became the Rockford Cubbies in 1995.

The Rockford Cubbies finished 75–65 overall in 1995 under manager was Steve Roadcap. Rockford lost in the first round of the playoffs to the Beloit Brewers two–games to zero. The Cubbies drew 110,052 fans, 10th in the league.

In 1996 the Cubbies finished 70-65 overall and drew fans 102,479 (11th). They defeated the Beloit Brewers two-games to one in the playoffs, but fell to the West Michigan WhiteCaps two–games to zero in the semifinals.

The 1997 Rockford Cubbies finished 66–66 overall under manager Rubén Amaro and missed the playoffs. The team drew 86,716 (11th).

In 1997, the Rockford franchise was sold to Sherrie Myers. The plan was announced to eventually move the franchise to Dayton, Ohio. This move of the franchise eventually took place in 2000.

The last year for the Rockford Cubbies was 1998. Rockford finished last in the first half in the central division at 32–39.  The Cubbies then won the second half at 39–29. In the playoffs, the Rockford Cubbies beat the Wisconsin Timber Rattlers (2–1) and the Fort Wayne Wizards (2–0) to advance to the Midwest League Finals. The Cubbies lost 3 games to 1 in the finals against the West Michigan Whitecaps. They drew 75,600 (11th).

The Rockford Reds  played 1999 as a Cincinnati Reds affiliate in Rockford's final Midwest League season. The Rockford Reds finished 45–24 in the first half to capture the Central Division first half crown. The Reds finished 31–39 in the second half of the season for an overall record of 76–63. The Rockford Reds played the franchises final games in losing in the first round of the postseason to two–games to zero the Wisconsin Timber Rattlers.

After the 1999 season, Rockford moved to Dayton, Ohio as planned and became the Dayton Dragons, who remain as members of the Midwest League.

The ballparks
In 1947–1949, the Rockford Rox played at Blackhawk Park. The ballpark was located within the park, located at 101 15th Avenue. Built in 1988, the Rockford Midwest League teams played at Marinelli Field. Still in use today, Marinelli Field is located at 101 15th Avenue, Rockford, Illinois.

Year–by–year records

Notable alumni

Miguel Batista (1990-1991)
Greg Colbrunn (1988)
Johnny Damon (1993) 2x MLB All-Star
Delino DeShields (1988)
Adam Dunn (1999) 2x MLB All-Star; Cincinnati Reds Hall of Fame
Kyle Farnsworth (1996)
Sal Fasano (1994)
Kevin Foster (1989)
Geremi Gonzalez (1995)
Willie Greene (1990)
Mark Grudzielanek (1992) MLB All-Star
Chris Haney (1990)
Eric Hinske (1998) 2002 AL Rookie of the Year
Austin Kearns (1999)
Tim Laker (1989–1990)
Kyle Lohse (1998)
Ramon Martinez (1994)
Corky Miller (1999)
Jose Molina (1996)
Rodney Myers (1993)
Chris Nabholz (1989)
Will Ohman (1998)
Carlos Perez (1992) MLB All-Star
Al Reyes (1991)
Mel Rojas (1988)
 Kirk Rueter (1992) San Francisco Giants Wall of Fame
Glendon Rusch (1993–1994)
Matt Stairs (1989)
Mike Sweeney (1994) 5x MLB All-Star; Kansas City Royals Hall of Fame
 Gabe White (1992)
Mark Wohlers (1999) MLB All-Star

See also
Rockford Expos playersRockford Forest Citys (minor league) players Rockford Cubbies playersRockford Royals playersRockford Reds playersRockford Rox players

References

Defunct baseball teams in Illinois
Defunct minor league baseball teams
Professional baseball teams in Illinois
Sports teams in Rockford, Illinois
1988 establishments in Illinois
1999 disestablishments in Illinois
Baseball teams established in 1988
Baseball teams disestablished in 1992
Rockford, Illinois
Defunct Midwest League teams
Montreal Expos minor league affiliates
Winnebago County, Illinois
Ogle County, Illinois